Golezen is a former settlement in the Municipality of Moravče in central Slovenia. It is now part of the village of Dešen. The area is part of the traditional region of Upper Carniola. The municipality is now included in the Central Slovenia Statistical Region.

Geography
Golezen lies in the extreme eastern part of the village of Dešen, below the south slope of Slivna Hill.

History
Golezen was annexed by Dešen in 1952, ending its existence as an independent settlement.

References

External links

Golezen on Geopedia

Populated places in the Municipality of Moravče
Former settlements in Slovenia